Ömer Erdoğan (born 3 May 1977) is a Turkish football coach and a former player. He most recently managed Süper Lig club MKE Ankaragücü.

Playing career
Erdoğan began his professional career in Germany. He signed with KSV Hessen Kassel when he was 17, and moved to FC St. Pauli the following year. Erdoğan played with fellow Turkish-German footballers Deniz Barış and Cem Karaca at the time. Erdoğan was transferred to Erzurumspor in 1998. Bursaspor courted Erdoğan in 1998, but he chose to sign with Erzurumspor instead. He would end up signing for Bursaspor in 2006.

Erdoğan had a successful stint at Diyarbakırspor from 2001 to 2003. At the end of the 2002–03 season, 15–16 clubs were interested in signing the centre back. He eventually signed for Galatasaray, citing Fatih Terim, then manager of the Istanbul-based club, as the main reason behind the move. He was a part of the Bursaspor squad that won the Süper Lig in 2009–10.

Coaching career
On 29 August 2022, the day after the resignation of Mustafa Dalcı, Erdoğan became the new manager of Süper Lig club MKE Ankaragücü.

Honours
Bursaspor
 Süper Lig: 2009–10

See also
Ömer Erdoğan: "Büyük olmak için bir şampiyonluk yetmez" — an extensive interview with Erdoğan

References

External links 
 TFF.org profile 
 

1977 births
Living people
Sportspeople from Kassel
German people of Turkish descent
Turkish footballers
German footballers
Footballers from Hesse
Turkey international footballers
Turkey B international footballers
Association football defenders
Süper Lig players
2. Bundesliga players
KSV Hessen Kassel players
FC St. Pauli players
Erzurumspor footballers
Diyarbakırspor footballers
Galatasaray S.K. footballers
Malatyaspor footballers
Bursaspor footballers
Turkish football managers
German football managers
Süper Lig managers
Fatih Karagümrük S.K. managers
Hatayspor managers
MKE Ankaragücü managers